The 1990 All-Ireland Senior Football Championship final was a Gaelic football match played at Croke Park on 16 September 1990 to determine the winners of the 1990 All-Ireland Senior Football Championship, the 104th season of the All-Ireland Senior Football Championship, a tournament organised by the Gaelic Athletic Association for the champions of the four provinces of Ireland. The final was contested by Cork of Munster and Meath of Leinster, with Cork winning by 0-11 to 0-9.

For the third time in four years Cork faced Meath in the All-Ireland decider, as the reigning champions did battle with the champions of 1987 and 1988. In the first half Cork had built up a nice lead before there plans were derailed somewhat. A pumped-up Colm O'Neill hit Meath's Mick Lyons and was dismissed from the field of play. In spite of this Cork still held a one-point lead at half-time.

The second half was a dour struggle. Cork's strategy of isolating Meath's extra player worked well as Shay Fahy dominated midfield. The final score of 0-11 to 0-9 gave Cork the title.

Cork's All-Ireland victory was their second in succession, the first and only time in their history that they retained the title. The win gave them their sixth All-Ireland title over all and put them fourth in their own right on the all-time roll of honour.

Meath were appearing in their first All-Ireland final since they triumphed in 1988. Defeat at the hands of Cork was the first of back-to-back All-Ireland defeats for the Royal County.

1990 is regarded as the greatest year in the history of the GAA in Cork. In winning the All-Ireland against Meath, Cork achieved a rare double as the Cork senior hurling team had earlier claimed the All-Ireland title against Galway.	
It also marked the 100th anniversary of Cork achieving their previous double.

Cork's Denis Walsh, as a substitute, and Teddy McCarthy became dual All-Ireland medallists once again; however, McCarthy's achievement was the most spectacular of all. As a member of the starting fifteen in both codes he became the first player in the history of the Gaelic Athletic Association to win All-Ireland medals in both codes in the same season. It is a record which still stands.

The referee played 9 seconds of additional time.

Match

Details

References

All-Ireland Senior Football Championship Final
All-Ireland Senior Football Championship Final, 1990
All-Ireland Senior Football Championship Finals
All-Ireland Senior Football Championship Finals
Cork county football team matches
Meath county football team matches